The Chagrin River is located in Northeast Ohio. The river has two branches, the Aurora Branch and East Branch. Of three hypotheses as to the origin of the name, the most probable is that it is a corruption of the name of a Frenchman, Sieur de Seguin, who established a trading post on the river ca. 1742. The Chagrin River runs through suburban areas of Greater Cleveland in Cuyahoga, Geauga, and Portage counties, transects two Cleveland Metroparks reservations, and then meanders into nearby Lake County before emptying into Lake Erie.

The East Branch begins in Geauga County, flows north then west through Lake County, largely in Kirtland, and Kirtland Hills,  In these communities the East Branch transects the Holden Arboretum, before intersecting the main in Willoughby.

The Aurora Branch begins in northwest Portage County, flowing northwest through Aurora and portions of Geauga and Cuyahoga Counties, intersecting the main branch west of Chagrin Falls.

The Chagrin River was designated as a state scenic river in 1979.

Natural history
Along its banks and tributaries  Berea sandstone, Bedford shale, Cleveland Shale, and Chagrin Shale bedrock, are exposed in layers. The river itself was cut through the Allegheny Plateau as glaciers receded in the area at the end of the Wisconsin glaciation.

The lowest visible bedrock is Chagrin shale. Named for the river and easily found in the river valley. Chagrin shale, is blue gray in color, an offshore alluvial, silt shale of the Devonian period. This layer is found below about  msl.

The next layer is Cleveland shale. This is a black shale that is an important source of local fossils. Cleveland Shale is found in the Chagrin River valley between 800 and  msl.

Bedford Shale is found above the Cleveland Shale layer. This layer is found in the ravines that carry tributaries of the Chagrin River. Bedford shale is a sand shale and is characterized by its roughly 90° cleavage pattern. Pieces of Bedford shale can look as if they were cut by human hands and are found up to about  msl.

Berea sandstone is found from around  msl to roughly  msl.  Berea sandstone, is  an important local building material. In the nineteenth century it was quarried from the base of Gildersleeve Mountain (in the East Branch watershed). This material was used to build Kirtland Temple and other local structures. Berea sandstone is still used as a local building material

According to the Ohio Department of Natural Resources, more than 49 species of fish and 90 bird species live in the Chagrin River watershed, including the American brook lamprey, which is relatively rare in Ohio.

Sports and recreation
Hiking is popular along many areas along the Chagrin River. Some area are also popular for fishing, and ESPN Outdoors recommends the Chagrin River for fishing, especially for finding steelhead. The Daniels Park Dam, a small lowhead dam, was their favorite spot. On December 31, 2004, the Daniels Park Dam failed due to excess pressure from ice and water.

The Aurora branch of the Chagrin River is a class III-IV of whitewater, according to the American Whitewater Association. On the other hand, the Daniels Park section is rated a class I.

Channelization
This activity was conducted by local developer Jerome Osborne who leases the land from the village. Both the village and Osborne have been cited for this illegal activity. This activity both threatened the riparian floodplain in the area of disruption, and increases the likelihood and severity of flooding in downstream the communities of Willoughby and  Eastlake. As of September 2007, a plan was being developed to restore the East Branch to its original condition, and further action against the cited parties is being considered.

Gallery

See also
List of rivers of Ohio

References

External links

Chagrin River Watershed Partners

Rivers of Ohio
Tributaries of Lake Erie
Rivers of Cuyahoga County, Ohio
Rivers of Geauga County, Ohio
Rivers of Lake County, Ohio
Rivers of Portage County, Ohio